Kennjiro Sakurai a.k.a. esm-artificial is a Canadian street artist  and graphic designer.

Biography

Originally from Vancouver, British Columbia, Sakurai graduated from the Emily Carr Institute of Art & Design in 1999. His work has been included in numerous exhibitions internationally.

Works
Sakurai mass-produces screen printings on the topic of American and popular world culture. Specific subjects often include supermodels, cars, rock stars, song lyrics, and television personalities. Sakurai's work also often addressed commodification and consumerism. His design work is less text-based than his serigraphs and paintings and can be seen in many movies.

See also
 List of street artists

External links
 
 Planet of the Arts 
 Influx 
 A Nice Set group exhibition/book
 Wooster Collective interview 2003
 Half Empty, Commissioning Street Art: Esm-Artificial 2004
 Interview from fashionlines.com, 2007
 Interview illicit exhibitions, 2009
 Interview from Domogeneous.com, 2011
 Victoria & Albert Museum, esm-artificial, Street Art, 2011
 Must see street art in Canada, 2012
 Artist analysis : esm-artificial, 2014
 Reconstruction: esm-artificial, 2014
 Carleton University Azrieli School of Architecture and Urbanism: esm-artificial, 2014 
 Making Space and Place: esm-artificial, 2014
 Artist feature by Catherine Tedford, Gallery Director, Richard F. Brush Art Gallery, St. Lawrence University, Canton, NY, 2015
 York University booklet: Kenn Sakurai/esm-artificial, 2016
 10 Canadian Graphic Designers, 2017
 Graffiti Artists |Worldwide, 2018
 Art on a Postcard, 2018
 Stickem, 2020

Year of birth missing (living people)
Living people
Graffiti and unauthorised signage
Esm, -artificial
Esm, -artificial